The Havana Suburban Railway is a passenger rail network serving the city of Havana, capital of Cuba, and its suburbs. Owned by the national company Ferrocarriles de Cuba, it represents the only suburban rail system of the Caribbean island.

Overview
Outside Havana, the network serves some towns of its metropolitan area in Artemisa and Mayabeque provinces. A little part of Matanzas Province is served by the only electrified line of Cuba, the Hershey Electric Railway from Havana Casablanca station to Matanzas.

Havana subway plans
Plans for the construction of a rapid transit network in Havana was studied in 1921. Other plans for a subway, based on Russian networks, were studied in the late 1970s and 1980s, due to the relationship between Cuba and the USSR. After the 1991 dissolution of the Soviet Union and the consequent lack of funds of the Cuban government, the proposal for a Havana Metro was abandoned.

Routes
The network consists of 8 lines, departing from the 3 terminal stations of Havana: Central (4 lines), Tulipán (or 19 de Noviembre, 3 lines) and Casablanca (1 line).

Note: the stations marked with "Hv" are located in the city of Havana.

Services
The network has limited use as urban transport and is primarily conceived to serve the suburbs and towns surrounding the capital. The price is very cheap and is subsidized by the state. Train frequency is low and varies between 2 and 5 daily departures per route and convoys are composed of 2 or 3 cars and diesel locomotives on some routes. Several stations are linked to the MetroBus, a bus network and the principal public urban transport of Havana. , the Cuban government was making efforts to revitalize the rail network and expand the service.

See also
Havana MetroBus

References

External links

Havana
Suburban Railway
Standard gauge railways in Cuba